Y.A.R.O. Ka Tashan is an Indian drama television series that aired from 26 July 2016 to 22 May 2017 on SAB TV.
It starred Anirudh Dave, Rakesh Bedi, Malini Kapoor and Mahira Sharma.

Plot
The story of the series is about Professor Govardhan Agrawal (Rakesh Bedi) and his wife Beena Agrawal (Malini Kapoor) who consider Y.A.R.O (Young Assembled Robotic Object) as their own son and programmed him to behave like a 6-year-old human but later 15 and 21 year old human. In the first episode, Professor Govardhan Agrawal is happily married to Beena. However, the couple does not have a child despite many years of marriage. Professor Agrawal creates a humanoid and names it Y.A.R.O . Professor and his wife treat Y.A.R.O as their own son and show love and affection to him. Three goons plan to kidnap Mr. Raju’s son. Y.A.R.O. comes to the rescue of the child and saves him from the kidnappers. On the other hand, Amar and Prem come to the office of Cool Advertising. Yaro makes a call to the police and informs them that a child has been kidnapped from his family. Y.A.R.O learns that Chaturvedi is getting late for his office. Yaro hits Chaturvedi’s scooter with full force which helps him reach the office in time. Dolly meets Yaro and suggests him to not cause any trouble to Chaturvedi in the future. Beena thanks Yaro for cleaning her house.

In episode 4, Y.A.R.O. welcomes his new tenants Amar, Prem and Shilpy to his house. He also extends his hand of friendship to them. However, the trio gets terrified to see Y.A.R.O.'s superhuman capabilities and avoid him. Later, Chaturvedi yells at Y.A.R.O.'s tenants for insulting him in their house. Dolly has fallen for Prem and she is trying hard to get his attention. On the other hand, Professor Govardhan Agrawal inserts a tracker in Y.A.R.O.'s body to keep an eye on his activities. Shilpy, Amar and Prem invite Y.A.R.O. to a party. They offer Y.A.R.O. a glass of juice which would ward off evil spirit from his body. Y.A.R.O. drinks the juice, which causes circuit damage in his body. Beena tells her tenants that Y.A.R.O. is a humanoid. Professor Govardhan decides to reboot the system of Y.A.R.O. He requests Amar and Prem to not allow Chaturvedi to enter his house. Then a new family enters the friends' colony. Thus Y.A.R.O. became the entertainment of people.

Cast
Anirudh Dave as Young Assembled Robotic Object aka Y.A.R.O (Bina and Govardhan Agrawal's son, Sanjana's husband, Amar, Prem, Dolly and Shilpy's friend)
Shubhi Ahuja as Sanjana Kapoor Agrawal (Y.A.R.O's wife)
Rakesh Bedi as Govardhan Agrawal (Y.A.R.O's father)
Malini Kapoor as Bina Agrawal (Y.A.R.O's mother)
Shoma Anand as Dadi Cool (Y.A.R.O's grandmother)
Mahira Sharma as Shilpy
Shivam Sharma/Abhishek Sharma as Amar 
Dheeraj Gumber as Prem
Ajay Sharma as Mr. X
Salim Zaidi as Inspector Doobey
Jayshree Soni as Dolly
Umesh Bajpai as Chaturvedi Chintamani
Manish Mishraa as Puppy sir
Krissann Barretto as Shanaya Oberoi
Gopi Bhalla as Goga Kapoor
Monica Castelino as Sushmita Kapoor (Shush)
Karan Chhabra as Ranjeet
Ishita Ganguly as Minty
Shakeel Abbasi  as Jatin Birbal
Jazz Sodhi as Petra
Shefali Rana as Prem's mother

References

External links
 

2016 Indian television series debuts
2017 Indian television series endings
Hindi-language television shows
Indian drama television series
Sony SAB original programming
Indian science fiction television series
Indian superhero television shows
Androids in television